Eucalyptus desmondensis, commonly known as Desmond mallee, is a species of slender mallee that is endemic to a small area in the south-west of Western Australia. It has smooth bark, lance-shaped adult leaves, flower buds in groups of between nine and nineteen, cream-coloured to pale yellow flowers and cup-shaped to barrel-shaped fruit.

Description
It has smooth whitish or pale brown bark, sometimes a drooping crown, and glaucous branchlets. Adult leaves are arranged alternately, thick, the same glossy grey-green on both sides. Flowering mainly occurs between May and November and the flowers are cream-coloured to pale yellow.

Taxonomy and naming
Eucalyptus desmondensis was first formally described in 1925 by Joseph Maiden and William Blakely from specimens collected by Charles Austin Gardner in 1924. The description was published in Journal and Proceedings of the Royal Society of New South Wales. The specific epithet (desmondensis) refers to the locality Desmond, a former mining town near Ravensthorpe. The ending -ensis is a Latin suffix "denoting place, locality, or country".

Distribution and habitat
Desmond mallee is found on sandplains and rocky hillsides in a small part of the southern Goldfields-Esperance region of Western Australia centered around the Fitzgerald River National Park where it grows in stony clay, loam or sandy granitic based soils. It is most easily seen along the road between Ravensthorpe and Hopetoun.

Conservation status
Eucalyptus desmondensis is classified as "Priority Four" by the Government of Western Australia Department of Parks and Wildlife, meaning that is rare or near threatened. All known populations are on private property or on Crown land and none are in conservation reserves.

See also
List of Eucalyptus species

References

desmondensis
Endemic flora of Western Australia
Mallees (habit)
Myrtales of Australia
Eucalypts of Western Australia
Trees of Australia
Goldfields-Esperance
Vulnerable flora of Australia
Plants described in 1925
Taxa named by Joseph Maiden
Taxa named by William Blakely